Warrior was an Australian bred Thoroughbred racehorse that won the 1869 Melbourne Cup at odds of 10/1.

Warrior raced 66 times for 27 wins which also included victories in the 1871 Melbourne Stakes and the 1873 Australian Cup.   In 1873 the horse broke his shoulder and was destroyed while racing at  Home Rule, New South Wales.

References

Melbourne Cup winners
1863 racehorse births
Racehorses bred in Australia
Racehorses trained in Australia
Horses who died from racing injuries